Turks in Turkmenistan are either Turkish people who live in Turkmenistan even though having been born outside Turkmenistan, or are Turkmenistan-born, but have Turkish roots. By Turkish roots, this could mean roots linking back to Turkey, or in neighbouring countries once part of the Ottoman Empire that still have a population whose language is Turkish or who claims a Turkish identity or cultural heritage.

Population 
According to the 2012 Turkmen census, there was 13,000 Turks living in Turkmenistan. The largest number of Turks were recorded in the capital city of Ashgabat where they numbered 10,500.

Turkish schools 
Due to the common ethnic, linguistic, religious, cultural and historical ties of Turkish and Turkmen people, the Turkish community in Turkmenistan are well integrated. In Turkmenistan there is 1 high school, 1 primary school, 1 Turkish Language Training Centre and 1 Vocational Training Centre operate in Ashgabat under the Turkish National Education Ministry.

See also  
Turkey–Turkmenistan relations
Demographics of Turkmenistan
Turks in the former Soviet Union

References

External links 
Soviet Census 1970: Turkmenistan
Soviet Census 1979: Turkmenistan
Soviet Census 1989: Turkmenistan

Turkmenistan
Turkmenistan
Ethnic groups in Turkmenistan
 
Turkey–Turkmenistan relations
Turkmenistan